Eugen Bauder (born 5 March 1986) is a German model and actor.

Early life

Bauder was born in Almaty, Kazakhstan on 5 March 1986. He moved to Germany at the age of five with his mother. He has live in various locations around Germany. After high school, he went to technical school in Binzen in Baden.

Career

Bauder has worked for major fashion houses such as Hugo Boss, DSquared², Calvin Klein, Jean Paul Gaultier and Armani. He is the current face of Cacharel's "Amor Pour Homme" fragrance.

There has been much speculation on the Internet amongst people in the fashion industry as they're under the impression that he has stopped working. Bauder seems to have turned his eyes elsewhere and has been working with the German agency Actors Connection jump starting an acting career.

References

External links 
 Eugen Bauder Official Website

1986 births
Living people
People from Almaty
Kazakhstani people of German descent
German male models